The Alfarelos train crash occurred on 21 January 2013 at the
Alfarelos station, in the Portuguese Northern Line. Two trains
crashed, after both passed signals at danger, wounding 25 people
and halting the Northern Line for three days.

Context

On the day of the accident, services were operating as usual in the
Northern Line. 
At 19:30, an InterCity train left Lisbon Santa Apolónia towards Porto Campanhã.

regional service towards Coimbra, where it was scheduled to arrive at 21:51.

Both trains were expected to meet at around 21:17 in Alfarelos, where the InterCity would overtake the regional.

Crash

The inquiry commission led by CP and REFER collected information about the events that led to the collision. According to their report,
shortly before arriving at Alfarelos, the regional train encountered a
caution signal (solid yellow), meaning that it would find a red signal
at Alfarelos. As the driver slowed down the train, so that it would stop before the red signal, it started slipping
on the rails.

The driver was not able to stop the train on time.  before the signal, with the train
brakes. This was not enough to stop the train which passed the signal at danger at a speed of
 and stopped  after the
signal.

Following the rules for this type of incident, the driver
contacted the REFER Lisbon Operational Command Center (CCO Lisboa),
awaiting instructions on how to proceed. The train could either be
told to go back to the signal, or to continue ahead.

At the same time, the InterCity train passed through the same caution
problems.
still , which prompted the driver to use the
sander. This train was also unable to stop on
time, and passed the signal at danger with a speed of
, moment at which CONVEL triggered the
emergency brakes. Shortly after, at 21:15, this train collided with

Aftermath

Despite the collision and the destruction, which included graphic
photos of a rail car torn apart, with the InterCity going through it
"like it were a tunnel", there were no fatalities: the three last cars, which suffered most of the damage, had no passengers. The driver of the InterCity locomotive survived by getting down on the floor.

The regional train would normally be one multiple unit with three
cars (CP Class 2240), but, on the night of the accident, this
train had two multiple units, 2257 and 2294, comprising six cars.

In the aftermath of the accident, the track was not used for several
days, as works were in progress to remove the debris and to repair the infrastructure, and authorities
carried on investigations.

A preliminary inquiry found no explanation for the accident,
but ruled out human error from the drivers, and malfunctions in the
signaling system.  According to the inquiry, on both cases, the brakes were
applied in a way that would have stopped the trains before the red
signal under normal operating conditions.

The inquiry commission concluded that there was lack of adhesion
between the wheels and the rails. The commission suggested a speed

References

Train collisions in Portugal
2013 in Portugal
Soure, Portugal
Railway accidents in 2013
Railway accidents involving a signal passed at danger
January 2013 events in Europe
2013 disasters in Portugal